White Knight Chronicles II{{refn|Known in Japan as {{nihongo|Shirokishi Monogatari: Hikari to Yami no Kakusei|白騎士物語 -光と闇の覚醒-||lit. White Knight Story: Light and Darkness' Awakening}}}} is a video game developed by Level-5 and published by Sony Computer Entertainment in Japan and Europe and by D3 Publisher in North America for the PlayStation 3. The game is a direct sequel to White Knight Chronicles (2008). The game was released in Japan on July 8, 2010, in PAL regions in June 2011, and in North America on September 13.

The game allows the player to transfer their character from White Knight Chronicles along with money, equipment and guild ranks. The game also contains a remastered version of the original White Knight Chronicles.

GameplayWhite Knight Chronicles II is similar to its predecessor White Knight Chronicles, a role-playing video game presented in a third-person perspective. However, some changes to improve gameplay in all aspects have been made, introducing battle system mechanics, combos, armor and weapons to make, enemies and dungeons.

Georama
The Georama system, an online mode that lets the player create their own town, is back with various changes. Now players can play with their friends online in quests of up to 6 characters.

Story
The games begins with a prologue in Faria, where the Farian general Scardigne is trying to get the Farian Princess Miu out of the city safely due to a civil war led by Ban Nanazel. They manage to escape the city but are pursued. The game then cuts to where Princess Cisna has summoned Leonard, Eldore and Yulie, she tells them that they need to go to Faria and speak with a mystic known as Father Yggdra. The group goes to Faria where they encounter Scardigne and Miu and save them from Ban Nanazel's forces. The group then learns that the now reborn Yshrenian Empire (formerly the Magi), headed by Grazel and High Priest Ledom (formerly Sarvain, the regent of Balandor following Cisna's kidnapping in the first game) from the previous game, supported Ban Nanazel. They travel back into the city and fight and defeat Ban Nanazel and save Father Yggdra who Ban Nanazel was attempting to destroy. Father Yggdra is revealed to be a sentient tree and the protector of the Moon Maiden, the final incorruptus from the war between Yshrenia and Athwani. For their reward, Father Yggdra gives them a book to go into the past, which they use to travel to the day the Magi attacked Balandor castle. They attempt to save the Archduke of Faria (Miu's grandfather) but fail. However, he gives them an insignia, which upon coming back they learn from Father Yggdra that they need to get three of. Knowing this they head to Greede. Once there, they learn that Greede's citizens are being poisoned by a purple mist. Once they find Caesar, their old friend and current ruler of Greede, they learn that a black dragon is causing the mist. They once again travel to the past where they learn they need a lance to defeat the dragon. Once they retrieve the lance and defeat the dragon, they learn that the desert town of Albana was taken over by Yshrenia. Leonard and co manage to oust the Yshrenians. As a reward, the Avatar is awarded with a mysterious stone. This stone technically allows the Avatar to become the sixth pact maker and bestow the ability to summon an incorruptus of their own which they're also able to modify to become equal to the other five. With Albana safe once again Leonard and party decide it's time to go against the now reborn Yshrenian army that has been residing on a volcanic island.

Back at Balandor things have gotten worse as Grazel and Shapur, pactmaker of the Black Knight, in their knight forms alongside their army have begun attacking the city in hopes of weakening them. Leonard, knowing this and the fact he cannot use his knight for much longer without having part of himself damaged, still goes against them to a point as him to become unconscious. Yulie believes the help of the Moon Maiden hidden inside Father Yggdra will help but requires the Ark of the knight to become its pact maker. Searching through the tunnels she eventually finds it and becomes the soul of the last knight and appears before the battlefield in earnest using her bow to destroy all the enemy ships and damage the Sun King and Black Knight with help. Defeated, the team regroups and begins to set for the Redhorn Isle, location of the Yshrenian army. Knowing they cannot use their knights unless desperate for they must save their strength for Grazel and Shapur, they reside in the flying ship whilst the army of Balandor sails alongside the Windwalkers who pay their debt to the party from the previous game. On the ship Queen Cisna prepares all of Balandor for attack, although in battle a majority of the Balandor knights are destroyed, and it is by the help of Faria that they are able to turn the tides and begin winning the new war.

Grazel sees this as a chance to test his new weapon, The Hand of God, a large island cannon powered by the volcano and magic combined. Aware of the destruction it can produce, Cisna asks Leonard and company to land on the island and destroy its power supply before they can make land to assist. After succeeding at this, Grazel traps the group with a large lava monster, Brimmflame, which once defeated begins to release the remaining volcanic substance upon the island forcing a retreat from both the new Yshrenian army and the Balandor/Faria alliance. Frustrated, Grazel with High Priest Ledom and Shapur appear in their true base of operations, Garmatha Fortress, a large floating castle that begins to head for Balandor with the plan of destroying it.

However, this is halted thanks to the Demithor, the beast the Free City of Greede rides upon, which turns itself to frozen stone to pause the Garmatha. With this advantage Leonard and friends instantly head for the fortress. There, Ledom reveals himself to be a fellow time traveler similar to Eldore who plans to join the knights to bring forth his former Lord and Master, Emperor Madoras of Yshrenia, from the past to establish a new empire and finish off Queen Cisna who carries the spirit of Queen Mureas of the Athwan Empire. He also reveals that Leonard is Madoras's intended vessel while the presence of the five knights combined triggers the Final Awakening, triggering Leonard's transformation into Madoras.

Without the knights, the party are forced to battle Madoras unaided until he is weakened, allowing Cisna to use her power to separate both Leonard and Madoras, causing the Emperor to disperse in the air. With Yshrenia defeated everyone returns to Balandor as the fortress begins to crumble under itself and into the ocean. Leonard, now unbound from the White Knight, places the Ark into storage. Although defeated, it is apparent Madoras survived the ordeal and resides in the rift readying himself to return in his own form without need of another's body.

Development

D3 Publisher confirmed that players would receive additional content that was on disc on release but failed to translate and release that content to its North American audience and instead shut down the North American servers while it still had an active and healthy player base.

ReceptionWhite Knight Chronicles II received "mixed" reviews according to the review aggregation website Metacritic. Famitsu gave it a score of one eight, one nine and two eights, with the reviewers criticizing the story but praising the updated gameplay features. The game sold 107,655 on its first day in sales and 162,289 in the first week, which was below expectations, given first-week sales of the first game. GameTrailers said: "It's hard to overlook White Knight Chronicles flaws the second time around. The subtle improvements don't have a huge impact on the bottom line, and the game lacks the refinements expected of a sequel. If you're looking for an RPG that delivers both a lengthy single-player mode and comprehensive online component, there are far better choices available". GameSpot praised the improvements to combat and the multiplayer, but criticized the single player. Game Informer said: "Where the game falls depressingly short is in Level-5 ignoring the many valid criticisms of the first game and churning out a cookie-cutter sequel that is even more of a rehash than the average yearly sports title or shooter franchise”.The A.V. Club gave the game an A−, saying that "the rewards for engaging, learning, and conquering Chronicles II are many, especially for those who enjoy falling into the sticky trap of co-operative online role-playing games, where loot is hard-earned with time and skill". 411Mania gave it a score of 7.5 out of 10: "In the end, White Knight Chronicles II'' is hard to recommend. If you liked the first game, then the sequel's improvements might be enough to make it a must have. If you like JRPG's like me, then you will find some enjoyment. But here is the catch: if you want to play offline only, SKIP THIS GAME. The online is the best part about the game and the single-player feels like an afterthought, like something you need to do in order to make online more fun. Thumbs in the middle, but leaning down". Digital Spy gave it a score of three stars out of five: "The quests and upgrades feel poorly applied, meaning the game struggles to establish its true purpose and identity. Stripping away all the extra elements brings just a pretty standard JRPG that offers little really to get excited about".

References

External links

SCEI official website 
Level-5 official website 

2010 video games
Cooperative video games
D3 Publisher games
Fantasy video games
Fictional knights in video games
Level-5 (company) games
PlayStation 3 games
PlayStation 3-only games
Role-playing video games
Sony Interactive Entertainment games
Video game sequels
Video games developed in Japan
Video games featuring protagonists of selectable gender
Video games set in castles
Video games set on fictional islands
White Knight Chronicles (video game series)
Japanese role-playing video games